Thomas Alexander Garrett Jr. (born March 27, 1972) is an American politician and attorney. He served one term in the United States House of Representatives for Virginia's 5th congressional district. A Republican, Garrett formerly represented the 22nd district in the Virginia Senate. In November 2022, Garrett announced he would run for the Virginia House of Delegates in 2023.

Early life and education
Thomas Garrett was born in Atlanta, Georgia, to Thomas Alexander Garrett Sr. and his wife, Lois. Garrett is a graduate of Louisa County High School and earned his undergraduate and law degrees from the University of Richmond.

Career
Garrett served for six years in the United States Army, where he was a Field Artillery officer.

Commonwealth's attorney
Garrett served as an Assistant Attorney General under Virginia Attorney General Bob McDonnell. In 2007, he was elected Commonwealth's Attorney for Louisa County.

State Senate
After the General Assembly redistricted the State Senate as required by the Virginia Constitution in 2011, Garrett decided to run for an open seat. The 22nd District was open due to the incumbent Republican Ralph K. Smith's home in Roanoke being drawn into another district.

In the Republican primary, Garrett came in first in a five-person field with nearly 26% of the vote and a margin of fewer than 200 votes. During his time in office, he served on the General Laws and Technology, Courts of Justice, Education and Health, and Privileges and Elections committees.

U.S House of Representatives

Elections

2016 

In May 2016, after three ballots at the Republican nominating convention, Garrett won the Republican nomination for U.S. Representative in Virginia's 5th congressional district.

In the November 2016 general election, Garrett defeated Democratic nominee Jane Dittmar, the former chairwoman of the Albemarle County Board of Supervisors. Garrett won with 58.2% of the vote to Dittmar's 41.6%.

2018

In the spring of 2018, reports surfaced that Garrett and his wife, Flanna, used his congressional staff for personal use, leading his chief of staff to abruptly resign. Personal use of the staff time included running errands, house sitting, chauffeuring his kids and cleaning up after their dog.

Rumors also spread that Garrett might not run again. Garrett clarified later that he intended to run in what political analyst Larry Sabato called "one of the oddest" speeches. As of April 2018, Garrett was outraised by multiple Democratic opponents. In light of these fundraising numbers, the Cook Political Report moved the race from "likely Republican" to the more competitive "leans Republican." Democrats went on to nominate former investigative journalist Leslie Cockburn.

On May 28, 2018, Garrett announced that he is an alcoholic and would not run seek a second term in 2018.

Tenure 
In January 2017, Garrett was named to the House Committees on Foreign Affairs, Homeland Security, and Education and the Workforce. He was also a member of the conservative House Freedom Caucus, though he told voters during the campaign that he would not join the group. Garrett was a member of the Republican Study Committee.

In March 2017, Garrett posed for a photo with Jason Kessler, one of his constituents who was an organizer of the Unite the Right rally, a far-right rally held in August 2017 in Charlottesville, Virginia. The rally became the site of violent clashes, leaving about 30 people injured, followed shortly by an incident in which a white supremacist rammed his car into a crowd, killing a woman and injuring 19 other people. After the rally, Garrett disavowed the organizer and said he was unaware of Kessler's role in the rally when they initially met.

Personal life 
In April 2019, Garrett and his wife, Flanna Sheridan, separated. In August 2021, Sheridan filed suit in Rockingham County Circuit Court for false imprisonment, emotional distress, trespassing and civil assault, seeking $450,000 in damages stemming from an attempt by Garrett to repossess a vehicle driven by Sheridan.

References

External links
 
 

|-

1972 births
21st-century American politicians
County and city Commonwealth's Attorneys in Virginia
Living people
People from Buckingham County, Virginia
People from Louisa County, Virginia
Politicians from Atlanta
Military personnel from Georgia (U.S. state)
Republican Party members of the United States House of Representatives from Virginia
United States Army officers
University of Richmond School of Law alumni
Virginia lawyers
Republican Party Virginia state senators
Virginia politicians convicted of crimes